Anthony Ingerson (born 13 October 1969) is a former Australian rules footballer who played with Adelaide and Melbourne in the Australian Football League (AFL).

Recruited from South Australian National Football League (SANFL) side Central District, Ingerson played mostly as a centre half forward while at Adelaide. He was traded to Melbourne in the 1996 pre-season and was used in defence at his new club by Melbourne coach Neale Daniher.

Ingerson was selected in the South Australian State of Origin squad in 1999 but did not play. In 2000 he played on Matthew Lloyd in the grand final and retired midway through the following season after suffering a knee injury.

External links

Holmesby, Russell and Main, Jim (2007). The Encyclopedia of AFL Footballers. 7th ed. Melbourne: Bas Publishing.

1969 births
Living people
Central District Football Club players
Adelaide Football Club players
Melbourne Football Club players
Australian rules footballers from South Australia